FITA may refer to:

Acronyms
 Friendly Islands Teachers' Association, a trade union in Tonga
 Fédération Internationale de Tir à l'Arc, known in English at the World Archery Federation
 Federazione Italiana Taekwondo, known in English at the Italian Taekwondo Federation
 Federation of International Trade Associations, for trade associations throughout the United States, Mexico and Canada that have an international mission
 Foundation for Information Technology Accessibility, an organisation advocating information communications technology (ICT) accessible to disabled people in the Maltese islands

Others
 Fita, the old Cyrillic letter Ѳ, ѳ
 feta
 fitter